Mona Pasquil Rogers (born Simeona Fortunata Pasquil; April 3, 1962) is an American politician who served as the 47th lieutenant governor of California from November 4, 2009 to April 27, 2010. Upon taking office, Pasquil Rogers became the first woman, Filipina, and person of Pacific Islander heritage to hold the role.

During her career, Pasquil Rogers has served in a variety of political roles, including as political director of John Kerry 2004 presidential campaign, and as appointments secretary under governor Jerry Brown.

In 2019, Pasquil Rogers was hired by Facebook as head of public policy for California. Pasquil Rogers was appointed to the California State Personnel Board in 2019, and in 2021 was elected to serve as the board's vice president.

Early life and education 
Pasquil was born and raised in a Filipino family in Sacramento County, California. Her father was a career social worker. When Pasquil was 12, she babysat for John Garamendi and his wife Patricia; Garamendi would later employ Pasquil in the office of the lieutenant governor. She earned a Bachelor of Arts degree in English from Marymount College in Salina, Kansas.

Career
Pasquil was the political director of the John Kerry 2004 presidential campaign. In the 2008 U.S. Presidential election, she served as a superdelegate supporting Hillary Clinton. In January 2011, California governor Jerry Brown named her appointments secretary.

Lieutenant governor of California 
On November 4, 2009, California Governor Arnold Schwarzenegger appointed Pasquil, Garamendi's chief of staff, as acting lieutenant governor pending the confirmation of Abel Maldonado.

Upon Pasquil's appointment, she became California's first Asian lieutenant governor; its first Filipino lieutenant governor; its first female lieutenant governor; and the first California acting lieutenant governor not to succeed to the position from the president pro tempore of the California State Senate.

Later career 
Pasquil Rogers went on to serve as California's Office of Emergency Services as a senior advisor. In 2019, Pasquil Rogers was hired as head of California public policy by Facebook. Pasquil Rogers was appointed to the California State Personnel Board in 2019, and was elected to serve as vice president for 2021.

See also
 List of female lieutenant governors in the United States
 List of minority governors and lieutenant governors in the United States

References

External links
 Mona F. Pasquil biography at joincalifornia.com
 
 

1962 births
Living people
American politicians of Filipino descent
California politicians of Filipino descent
California Democrats
Lieutenant Governors of California
Women in California politics
People from Sacramento County, California
American women of Filipino descent in politics
Political chiefs of staff
21st-century American women